Chromis earina is a species of fish in the family Pomacentridae. It differs from its cogenerates on a colour and morphological basis.

References

Further reading
Bouchet, Philippe, Hervé Le Guyader, and Olivier Pascal. "The altruism of biodiversity exploration expeditions." Zoosystema 34.2 (2012): 193–202.
西山肇, et al. "鹿児島県硫黄島から採集された日本初記録のスズメダイ科魚類ヒスイスズメダイ (新称) Chromis earina." 魚類学雑誌 59.1 (2012): 61–67.

External links

earina
Fish described in 2008